The VB2N ("two-deck suburban car") is a double-deck passenger car used on Transilien suburban rail services in the Île-de-France region of France. The cars are unpowered and designed to be paired with an electric locomotive.

The coaches, built from 1974, are the successors of the Chemins de Fer de l'État's 1933 built Voiture État à 2 étages. They are currently in use on Line J of the Transilien network. They were previously used on RER lines C and D, Transilien lines H and K as well as services between Gare de l'Est and Tournan station, which became the RER E.

Since 2012, the VB2N trains have been shifted from busier RER and Transilien lines to less busy routes on Transilien network as new equipment comes online, most notably the single-level Z 50000 "Francilian" and double-deck Regio 2N (Z 57000) trainsets. The VB2N trains are scheduled to be completely retired by the end of 2022.

Description 

The VB2Ns are designed to be used in push-pull mode, although the cars are not powered, there is a control car at one end of the train so that the locomotive does not have to run around its train at the terminus.

Passenger space is divided in two levels. Each end of coach is a vestibule from which two separate sets of stairs lead to the upper and lower-decks. The walkway and seating on the lower deck is situated below platform level to gain space and avoid unnecessary height. The upper-deck is relatively spacious as height is restricted although adults may walk standing up.

All coaches have toilets apart from both end carriages.

Next stop is announced vocally and visually.

Use

Transilien Line J 

On Transilien Line J, the VB2Ns are used on:
 Groupe IV (Gare Saint-Lazare – Mantes-la-Jolie station via Conflans-Sainte-Honorine station),
 Groupe V (Gare Saint-Lazare – Mantes-la-Jolie station via Poissy station),
 Groupe VI (Gare Saint-Lazare – Pontoise station/Boissy-l'Aillerie Station/Gisors Station).

They are propelled by SNCF Class BB 17000 (numbered 17001 to 50, 56 to 58, 61, 64, 65, 78 to 80 and 17102 to 105).

The VB2Ns used on Transilien Line J have three numbering schemes, 90 upwards for coaches in original orange and grey livery, 101 upwards for coaches in IdF blue, white and red livery and 201 upwards for coaches in Transilien livery.

Transilien Line N 
On Transilien Line N, the VB2Ns are used on:

On the Gare Montparnasse suburban network, VB2Ns are used on:
 Gare Montparnasse – Rambouillet station
 Gare Montparnasse – Dreux station
 Gare Montparnasse – Mantes-la-Jolie station via Versailles-Chantiers station

The VB2Ns used on Transilien Line N has a different number scheme. Their running number begins with a number representing the number of coaches the consist of VB2N possesses, followed by a letter, beginning with A.

Retirement 
The VB2N equipment was retired starting in 2019, as Île-de-France Mobilités and SNCF replaced them with newer equipment. Since early 2019, the VB2N trains on the Transilien Line J are gradually being replaced by the Z 50000 "Francilian" single-level electric multiple unit (EMU) trainsets. Starting in 2021, the VB2N trains on the Transilien Line N are scheduled to be replaced by new Regio 2N (Z 57000) double-deck EMU trainsets. Additionally, starting in 2022, some of the Transilien Line J traffic between Paris and Mantes-la-Jolie will be shifted to an extension of the RER E line which will be equipped with Z 58000 "RER NG" double-deck EMU trainsets.

Derivative series 

Two other series of French trainsets are derived from the VB2N :

-Voiture Omnibus à 2 Niveaux (VO2N)
VO2N which are a series of trainsets intended for TER (regional express train) links in the Haute Normandie, Picardie and Centre-Val de Loire regions.

-Voiture Régionale à 2 Niveaux (VR2N) 
VR2N which are also trainsets intended for regional TER services in the Nord-Pas-De-Calais region.

References

See also 

 Voiture État à 2 étages

SNCF coaching stock
Double-decker rail vehicles